A people mover is an automated guideway transit system.

People mover or People Mover may also refer to:

 People Mover (Anchorage), a public transportation agency in Anchorage, Alaska, United States
 People Mover (Venice), a people mover in Venice, Italy
 PeopleMover, a former Disneyland attraction
 PeopleMover (Magic Kingdom), a Walt Disney World Resort Magic Kingdom attraction, which is originally the Tomorrowland Transit Authority PeopleMover
 Detroit People Mover, Michigan, United States
 Indiana University Health People Mover
 Parry People Mover, a light rail vehicle
 Minivan/MPV, a hatchback type vehicle
 Niagara Parks Commission People Mover, Ontario, Canada
 Schmid peoplemover, an elevator capable of crossing a road

See also
 Moving walkway